Julian Martin Leeser (born 25 May 1976) is an Australian politician and is currently serving as Australia's Shadow Attorney-General and Shadow Minister for Indigenous Australians. He is a member of the Liberal Party and has represented the Division of Berowra since the 2016 federal election.

Early life
Leeser was born in Sydney. His father John, an accountant, was the son of Jewish refugees from Nazi Germany, while his mother Sylvia is a fifth-generation Australian whose father was a survivor of the Burma Railway.

Leeser holds the degrees of Bachelor of Arts (Hons.) and Bachelor of Laws from the University of New South Wales. He sat on Woollahra Council for Bellevue Hill Ward from 1995 to 1999 as an independent. Aged 19 at the time, he was estimated to be the youngest local councillor elected in NSW history. In 1999 he served as a member of Prime Minister John Howard's No campaign during the republic referendum. In 2000, he was an associate to Justice Ian Callinan of the High Court of Australia.

Leeser worked as an adviser for Minister for Workplace Relations Tony Abbott in 2001 and for Philip Ruddock between 2004 and 2006. He worked as a solicitor for Mallesons Stephen Jaques between 2002 and 2004. In 2006 he joined the Menzies Research Centre as executive director, before becoming Director of Government Policy & Strategy at the Australian Catholic University in July 2012.

Leeser has written several articles defending the legacy of Prime Minister William McMahon, as well as an obituary of McMahon's wife Sonia for The Australian. He authored McMahon's entry in the Australian Dictionary of Biography, and as of 2016 was working on a full-length biography.

Parliament
Leeser joined the Liberal Party in 1992 and served as vice-president of the Liberal Party of Australia (New South Wales Division) from 2015 to 2016. He was elected to parliament at the 2016 federal election, succeeding the retiring Philip Ruddock in the Division of Berowra. In his maiden speech he spoke of the impact of his father's suicide when he was 20 years old. 

After the 2019 election Leeser became chair of the Joint Standing Committee on Migration and the House of Representatives Standing Committee on Indigenous Affairs.

After the 2022 election, Leeser was elevated to Peter Dutton's shadow ministry as the Shadow Attorney-General and Shadow Minister for Indigenous Australians.

He has been identified as a member of either the moderate or centre-right faction of the Liberal Party.

Personal life
Leeser is married to Joanna Davidson and has two children; James, born in 2018 and Ruth, born in 2022. He lives with his family in Thornleigh Leeser is the first Jewish Liberal member of the House of Representatives from New South Wales and a member of the Emanuel Synagogue in Woollahra.

References

Living people
Academic staff of the Australian Catholic University
Municipality of Woollahra
New South Wales local councillors
Australian monarchists
Australian solicitors
Jewish Australian politicians
Lawyers from Sydney
Liberal Party of Australia members of the Parliament of Australia
Members of the Australian House of Representatives
Members of the Australian House of Representatives for Berowra
People from the North Shore, Sydney
Politicians from Sydney
University of New South Wales alumni
University of New South Wales Law School alumni
1976 births
21st-century Australian politicians
People educated at Cranbrook School, Sydney